Madelon Baans (born 8 October 1977 in Rotterdam) is a retired female breaststroke swimmer from the Netherlands, who competed for her native country in three consecutive Summer Olympics, starting in 1996 in Atlanta, Georgia. She made her last international appearance at the European Short Course Swimming Championships 2005 in Trieste, Italy. 

Baans is 49 time Dutch national champion (24 on long course), current Dutch national record holder at the 100 m breaststroke in either the short course (25 m) and long course (50 m). During the 2004 European Championships in Madrid, she won the bronze medal as being part of the 4×100 m medley, in the same year she reached the final at the 2004 Summer Olympics on the same discipline. She announced her retirement in November 2006.

See also 
 List of Dutch records in swimming

References 
 Dutch Olympic Committee
 Profile in Zwemkroniek (in Dutch)

1977 births
Dutch female breaststroke swimmers
Living people
Olympic swimmers of the Netherlands
Swimmers from Rotterdam
Swimmers at the 1996 Summer Olympics
Swimmers at the 2000 Summer Olympics
Swimmers at the 2004 Summer Olympics
European Aquatics Championships medalists in swimming